An in-joke, also known as an inside joke or a private joke, is a joke whose humour is understandable only to members of an ingroup; that is, people who are in a particular social group, occupation, or other community of shared interest. It is, therefore, an esoteric joke, only humorous to those who are aware of the circumstances behind it.

In-jokes may exist within a small social clique, such as a group of friends, or extend to an entire profession or other relatively large group. An example is:
Q: What's yellow and equivalent to the axiom of choice?
A: Zorn's lemon. 
Individuals not familiar with the mathematical result Zorn's lemma are unlikely to understand the joke. The joke is a pun on the name of this result. 

Ethnic or religious groups may also have in-jokes.

Philosophy
In-jokes are cryptic allusions to shared common ground that act as selective triggers; only those who share that common ground are able to respond appropriately. An in-joke may be used to build community, sometimes at the expense of outsiders. Part of the power of an in-joke is that its audience knows that many do not understand it.

An in-joke can also be used as a subtext, where people in the know may find humor in something not explicitly spoken. They may even apologize for doing so to a rookie, directly or indirectly stating that what they were laughing at was an in-joke.

See also
Shibboleth
Cultural appropriation
Fictitious entry
Mathematical joke
Military humor
Order of the Occult Hand
Dog-whistle politics

References

 
Humor research

de:Witz#Insiderwitz
sv:Humor#Internskämt